Syntomium is a genus of beetles belonging to the family Staphylinidae.

The species of this genus are found in Europe and Northern America.

Species:
 Syntomium aeneum (Müller, 1821) 
 Syntomium caucasicum Khachikov & Bibin, 2016

References

Staphylinidae
Staphylinidae genera